Barbara Laker is an American journalist for the Philadelphia Daily News. She won with Wendy Ruderman the 2010 Pulitzer Prize for Investigative Reporting.

Life
She grew up in Kent, England.
She immigrated when she was 12.
She graduated from Missouri School of Journalism with a BJ in 1979.
She worked for the Clearwater Sun, the Atlanta Journal-Constitution, the Dallas Times-Herald, and the Seattle Post-Intelligencer.

The "Tainted Justice" series, brought about an FBI / Philadelphia Police internal affairs investigation.

Works
Busted: A Tale of Corruption and Betrayal in the City of Brotherly Love, HarperCollins, 2014, 978-0-06-208544-3

References

External links
"City reveals 47 arbitration decisions involving Philadelphia cops", Philadelphia Daily News, Barbara Laker, Chris Brennan, Wendy Ruderman, December 24, 2010
"Covering 'Tainted Justice' And Winning A Pulitzer", NPR
"Daily News Pulitzer Prize winners Barbara Laker and Wendy Ruderman", WHYY, April 14, 2010
journalist's Twitter

American women journalists
University of Missouri alumni
British emigrants to the United States
Pulitzer Prize for Investigative Reporting winners